José Ibar Martínez (born May 4, 1969) is a Cuban baseball player and Olympic silver medalist.

References 
 
 

1969 births
Living people
Vaqueros de la Habana players
Olympic baseball players of Cuba
Olympic silver medalists for Cuba
Olympic medalists in baseball
Medalists at the 2000 Summer Olympics
Baseball players at the 2000 Summer Olympics
Pan American Games gold medalists for Cuba
Baseball players at the 1995 Pan American Games
Baseball players at the 1999 Pan American Games
Pan American Games medalists in baseball
Medalists at the 1995 Pan American Games
Medalists at the 1999 Pan American Games
20th-century Cuban people